Coláiste na nGael is an organization that aims to promote the Irish language in  Britain.

History
Since the 1980s, there has been a steady increase in the language in Britain.  Teachers like Siobhán Uí Néill and Seoirse Ó Broin did much to promote the language in Britain during the 1980s.  However, rapid growth occurred in 2000, with the establishment of Coláiste na nGael.  This cultural organisation was, from the outset committed to a non-religious and non-political ethos. In the words of its founder, Christy Evans: “Coláiste na nGael has only one aim – to share our ancient and beautiful language with the world”.

Coláiste na nGael now operates in over twenty British cities, and has teachers and students from a wide range of social and ethnic backgrounds. The organisation has held events at the Eden Project in Cornwall, the British Museum in London, Reykjavík in Iceland, the Basque Country, Brittany and many other locations.

Coláiste na nGael has won a number of cultural awards.  Christy Evans won the Léargas Language Ambassador Award in 2006, and the Glór na nGael ‘Global Gaeilge’ Award in 2008 and 2010.  Christy Evans also won a ‘Pride of Ireland’ Award in 2007.

Coláiste na nGael also conducts research, and its work on the Irish language in Britain was presented to 10 Downing Street in 2011.  As Irish has grown in Britain, the demand for ‘high-level’ Irish classes has increased.

References

Cultural organisations based in the United Kingdom
Linguistics organizations
Irish language activists